"Hazardous" is the title track and second single to be taken from Vanessa Amorosi's fourth studio album Hazardous. "Hazardous" was released on 11 December 2009 in Australia.

Track listing
CD single
"Hazardous" – 3:26
"This Is Who I Am" (The Lonewolf Version) – 5:54
"Hazardous" (The MachoString Remix) – 3:41
"Hazardous" (The MotorPsycho Club Remix) – 3:57

Charts

Release history

References

2009 singles
Vanessa Amorosi songs
Songs written by Vanessa Amorosi
Songs written by Stefanie Ridel
Songs written by Stuart Crichton
2009 songs
Universal Records singles
Songs written by Tommy Lee James